Cao Ying (born November 23, 1974 in Changsha, Hunan) is a Chinese sports shooter. She competed in the 2000 Summer Olympics and in the 2004 Summer Olympics.

External links
 Sports Profile

1974 births
Living people
Chinese female sport shooters
ISSF pistol shooters
Olympic shooters of China
Sportspeople from Changsha
Shooters at the 2000 Summer Olympics
Shooters at the 2004 Summer Olympics
Asian Games medalists in shooting
Shooters at the 1998 Asian Games
Shooters at the 2006 Asian Games
Asian Games gold medalists for China
Asian Games bronze medalists for China
Medalists at the 1998 Asian Games
Medalists at the 2006 Asian Games
Sport shooters from Hunan
21st-century Chinese women